Goswell may be a reference to:

Goswell Road, a road in the London Borough of Islington; or
Rachel Goswell, singer-songwriter and member of several bands including Slowdive.